Andrzej Licis (10 September 1932 – 17 April 2019) was a Polish international tennis player. He competed in the Davis Cup a number of times, from 1956 to 1960.

References

External links
 
 

1932 births
2019 deaths
Polish male tennis players
People from Olkusz
Sportspeople from Lesser Poland Voivodeship